Man-made refers to something that is artificial.

Man-made may also refer to:

Man-made hazard
Man-Made, an album by British alternative rock band Teenage Fanclub
"Man Made", a song by A Flock of Seagulls on their album A Flock of Seagulls
Man-Made Food, a Canadian television cooking show
Man Made Monster, a science fiction horror film released by Universal Pictures in 1941
 Man Made Machine, an American rock band from Phoenix, Arizona
 Man Made Object, the third album by jazz piano trio GoGo Penguin

See also
 
 
 
 
 
 
Artificial (disambiguation)
Synthetic (disambiguation)